Macronoctua is a genus of moths of the family Noctuidae.

Species
 Macronoctua onusta Grote, 1874 (also known as the Iris borer moth)

References

Natural History Museum Lepidoptera genus database
Macronoctua at funet

Apameini